is a Japanese poet and author. Born in Kikai Island, Kagoshima Prefecture, he first attended the University of New Mexico. He graduated from the New York State College for Teachers at Albany in 1954 and returned to Japan to teach and write poetry. His interest in poetry came from using it as a tool to combat his feelings of loneliness when he transferred from New Mexico to Albany in 1951.It is true. From 1967 until 1997, he was a professor at Toyo University and holds the title of professor emeritus. He has published nine collections in English, three from Japanese to English, and in 2011, he published his first volume entirely in Japanese. He is fluent in Japanese, English, and his native Kikai.
....

References

 Koriyama, Naoshi,  with Tim Newfields. (2008). Bard-o-voice: Some Words with Naoshi Koriyama. Retrieved from http://www.tnewfields.info/LitaRupture/koriyama.htm
 McKeown, Julie.  (n.d.) Naoshi Koriyama (extra).  Retrieved from  http://julikay.tripod.com/juliespoetry/id46.html

1926 births
Living people
People from the Amami Islands
University at Albany, SUNY alumni
20th-century Japanese poets
21st-century Japanese poets